Gerald Butler (born June 5, 1954) is a former professional American football wide receiver in the National Football League for the Kansas City Chiefs. He played college football at Nicholls State University and was named first-team Kodak All-American by the American Football Coaches Association (AFCA) in 1976. He was drafted in the seventh round of the 1977 NFL Draft by the Chicago Bears and played the 1977 season with the Kansas City Chiefs.

References

External links
Nicholls State bio
NFL bio

1954 births
Living people
Players of American football from New Orleans
American football wide receivers
All-American college football players
Nicholls Colonels football players
Kansas City Chiefs players